Claudio De Miro (born 19 December 1956) is an Italian diver. He competed in two events at the 1976 Summer Olympics.

References

External links
 

1956 births
Living people
Italian male divers
Olympic divers of Italy
Divers at the 1976 Summer Olympics
Divers from Naples